The Toxic Avenger is a multimedia low-budget superhero comedy splatter film franchise originating with the 1984 film The Toxic Avenger, and continuing through three film sequels, a stage musical production, a comic book series from Marvel Comics, a video game and a children's TV cartoon. Two less successful sequels, The Toxic Avenger Part II and The Toxic Avenger Part III: The Last Temptation of Toxie, were filmed as one. Director Lloyd Kaufman realized that he had shot far too much footage for one film and re-edited it into two. A third independent sequel was also released, titled Citizen Toxie: The Toxic Avenger IV. An animated children's TV series spin-off, Toxic Crusaders, featured Toxie as the leader of a team of mutated superheroes who fought against evil alien polluters. The cartoon series was short-lived and quickly cancelled. In 2019, it was announced that Legendary Pictures would be making a reboot of the film, with original creators Lloyd Kaufman and Michael Herz of Troma Entertainment serving as producers, and Macon Blair serving as writer and director.

The films generally follow the heroic exploits of Melvin Ferd, a weak and skinny janitor turned into the deformed and mutated superhero, the Toxic Avenger, or "Toxie", by exposure to toxic chemicals. All films in the series were released by Troma Entertainment, known for producing low budget B-movies with campy concepts and gruesome violence.  Virtually ignored upon its first release, The Toxic Avenger caught on with filmgoers after a long and successful midnight movie engagement at the famed Bleecker Street Cinemas in New York City in late 1985. It eventually came to be regarded as a cult classic.

Films

The Toxic Avenger (1984)

Tromaville has a monstrous new hero. The Toxic Avenger is born when meek mop boy Melvin falls into a vat of toxic waste. Now evildoers will have a lot to lose.

The Toxic Avenger Part II (1989)

The Toxic Avenger is tricked into traveling to Tokyo to search for his estranged father, leaving Tromaville open to complete domination by an evil corporation.

The Toxic Avenger Part III: The Last Temptation of Toxie (1989)

Toxie finds he has nothing to do as a superhero, as he has ridden his city of evil. He decides to go to work for a major corporation, which he discovers may be the evilest of all his adversaries.

Citizen Toxie: The Toxic Avenger IV (2000)

The Toxic Avenger must defend his friends from his own evil alternate universe doppelgänger, The Noxious Offender.

The Toxic Avenger (TBA)

Based on the 1984 cult classic of the same name. Set in a fantasy world following Winston, a stereotypical weakling who works as a janitor at Garb-X health club and is diagnosed with a terminal illness that can only be cured by an expensive treatment that his greedy, power hungry employer refuses to pay for. After deciding to take matters into his own hands and rob his company, Winston falls into a pit of toxic waste and is transformed into a deformed monster that sets out to do good and get back at all the people who have wronged him. On December 10, 2018, it was announced that Legendary Pictures had the rights to reboot the film, with Kaufman and Herz set to serve as the film's producers. In March 2019, Macon Blair was announced to write and direct the upcoming reboot. In December 2020, Peter Dinklage is set to star. In April 2021, Jacob Tremblay also joined the cast with Taylour Paige, who joined in May 2021. On June 12, 2021, it was announced that Kevin Bacon had joined the film as the villain followed by Julia Davis and Elijah Wood on June 16, 2021.

Television

Toxic Crusaders (1991)

A group of mutants fight against the pollution-loving alien Dr. Killemoff in the fictional city of Tromaville, led by Toxie, a nerd-turned-superhero.

Cast and crew

Principal cast
 A  indicates the actor portrayed the role of a younger version of the character.
 An  indicates a role as an older version of the character.
 A  indicates the actor or actress lent only his or her voice for his or her film character.
 An  indicates the model served as a body double, with the actor or actress's likeness superimposed onto the model.
 An  indicates the actor or actress lent only their likeness for his or her film character.
 An  indicates an appearance through a photographic still.
 An  indicates an appearance through archival footage or audio.
 A dark gray cell indicates the character was not in the film.

Other media

Musical
 The Toxic Avenger (musical) – musical based on the film The Toxic Avenger

Video game
 Toxic Crusaders (video game)

See also
 Sgt. Kabukiman N.Y.P.D., film conceived while filming The Toxic Avenger Part II in Japan
 All I Need to Know about Filmmaking I Learned from The Toxic Avenger, autobiographical book

References

 
American film series
Comedy film franchises
Fictional characters from New Jersey
Fictional janitors
Fictional mutants
Fictional vigilantes
Films adapted into plays
Films adapted into television shows
Film series introduced in 1984
Horror film franchises
Splatterpunk